The Randić index, also known as the connectivity index, of a graph is the sum of bond contributions  where  and  are
the degrees of the vertices making bond i ~ j.

History
This graph invariant was introduced by Milan Randić in 1975. It is often used in chemoinformatics for investigations of organic compounds.

Notes

References
Roberto Todeschini, Viviana Consonni (2009) "Molecular Descriptors for Chemoinformatics", Wiley-VCH, 
.

Graph invariants
Mathematical chemistry
Cheminformatics
de:Randić-Index